Friedrich Ernst Ludwig Fischer (20 February 1782, Halberstadt – 17 June 1854) was a Russian botanist, born in Germany. He was director of the St Petersburg botanical garden from 1823 to 1850.

In 1804 he obtained his medical doctorate from the University of Halle, afterwards working as director of Count Razumoffsky's botanical garden in Gorenki (near Moscow). In 1808 he produced a catalogue of plants of the garden. In 1823 he was appointed director of the imperial botanical garden in St. Petersburg by Alexander I. Here, he was involved with establishing a herbarium and library, as well as the planning of numerous scientific expeditions into the interior of Russia. During his final years, he served as a medical councillor for the Ministry of the Interior.

In 1815, he was elected a corresponding member of the Royal Swedish Academy of Sciences. In 1841, his status was changed to that of foreign member.

Selected works 
 Catalogue du Jardin des plantes de S.E. Monsieur le comte Alexis de Razoumoffsky ... à Gorenki près de Moscou, 1808–1812.
 Beitrag zur botanischen Systematik, die Existenz der Monocotyledoneen und dem Polycotyledoneen betreffend, 1812 - Contributions to plant systematics, the existence of Monocotyledon, etc.
 Enumeratio plantarum novarum a CI. Schrenk lectarum, 1841 (with Carl Anton von Meyer).
 Jardin de Saint-Pétersbourg, 1846. (Sertum Petropolitanum Seu Icones Et Descriptiones Plantarum Quæ in Horto Botanico ..., 1846 (with Carl Anton von Meyer).

References

1782 births
1854 deaths
People from Halberstadt
Botanists with author abbreviations
19th-century German botanists
19th-century botanists from the Russian Empire
Pteridologists
Members of the Royal Swedish Academy of Sciences
Corresponding members of the Saint Petersburg Academy of Sciences